You Young (Hangul: 유영; born May 27, 2004) is a South Korean figure skater. She is the 2020 Four Continents silver medalist, a four-time Grand Prix bronze medalist, a four-time Challenger series medalist, and a five-time South Korean national champion (2016, 2018, 2019, 2020, 2022.)

On the junior level, she is the 2020 Youth Olympic champion, the 2018 JGP Slovakia bronze medalist, and the 2019 Winter Children of Asia International Sports Games champion.

You is the youngest ever national champion of South Korea at age 11 in 2016, surpassing the previous record set by Yuna Kim, who won at age 12 in 2003. She is also the first Korean woman to successfully land a triple Axel in an international competition and the first Asian woman to win the gold medal in Figure skating at the Winter Youth Olympics.
She currently holds the fourth highest technical element score in the short program (45.54 at the 2019 Skate Canada) and the ninth highest technical element score in the free skate (79.94 at the 2020 Four Continents). She remains the first and only female skater to have landed the triple Axel at the Youth Olympics.

Competing in the 2022 Beijing Olympics, You placed 6th overall. As of April 17, 2022, You is the 4th highest ranked women's singles skater in world by the International Skating Union.

Personal life
You Young is the third child and only daughter of her father, You Il-jin, who ran a business in Indonesia, and mother, Lee Sook-hee. She moved to Indonesia at age two because of her father's business and spent her youth in Singapore. She enrolled in Bukit Timah primary school and attended school for a year before she returned to South Korea.

You's father passed away in February of 2022.

Career

Early career 
You Young began skating after watching Yuna Kim's victory at the 2010 Winter Olympic Games. Though maintaining South Korean nationality, she was raised in Singapore, trained under various coaches, and competed in the Singapore National Figure Skating Championships from 2011 to 2013.

One of her coaches was Singapore-based Zhang Wei, a former Chinese national ice dancer who won gold with partner Wang Rui at the 1999 Asian Winter Games, who she trained with for six months in 2012. Zhang said her talent was evident even then and told TODAY: "She's not the most talented athlete I've coached. But her jumps, explosive energy, flexibility and coordination were very good then, and it is very rare that you get all these qualities in one athlete, particularly at that age." He is confident that You has what it takes to become a future world and Olympic champion. On his advice, You returned to South Korea with her mother in March 2013 to further her development as the training environment is better.

2015–2016 season: National title 
In January 2016, You Young won the gold medal at the 2016 South Korean Figure Skating Championships, becoming the youngest-ever national champion of South Korea at age 11, surpassing the previous record set by Yuna Kim who won at age 12 in 2003.

In March, You won the gold medal at the novice level of the Cup of Tyrol.

2016–2017 season 
In November 2016, You won the silver medal at the novice level of the Tallinn Trophy behind Alena Kanysheva of Russia.

In January 2017, she finished fifth at the 2017 South Korean Figure Skating Championships mainly because of a fall in the short program.

2017–2018 season: Junior international debut 

You debuted on the Junior Grand Prix (JGP) series in September 2018, placing fourth at JGP Croatia in Zagreb. In October, she placed fifth at JGP Italy in Egna.

In January 2018, she won the gold medal at the 2018 South Korean Figure Skating Championships, earning her second national title.

In March, You finished ninth at the 2018 World Junior Championships.

2018–2019 season: Third national title 

In August 2018, You began competing on the JGP series, winning the bronze medal at JGP Slovakia in Bratislava, behind Russians Anna Shcherbakova and Anna Tarusina.  It is currently her first and only JGP medal. She then placed fourth at JGP Canada in Richmond, British Columbia, Canada.

After earning her third national title, You was assigned to the 2019 World Junior Championships. In February 2019, she won gold at the 2019 Bavarian Open and the 2019 Winter Children of Asia ISG. After a poor short program at Junior Worlds that left her in eleventh place, You rose to sixth place overall with a stronger free skate.

2019–2020 season: Senior international debut 

You opened her season at the 2019 Philadelphia Summer International, where she won the gold medal. You debuted on the Challenger series, winning the bronze medal at the 2019 CS Lombardia Trophy behind Russians Anna Shcherbakova and Elizaveta Tuktamysheva after she placed second in the short program and third in the free program. At this competition, she scored over 70 points in the short program, 130 points in the free skate, and 200 points overall for the first time in an ISU-sanctioned competition. One week later, You won the silver medal at another Challenger, the 2019 CS U.S. Classic, winning the free skate by scoring over 140 points for the first time. During this period, it was reported that You made a coaching change, with Mie Hamada becoming her primary coach along with Tammy Gambill.

Making her senior Grand Prix debut at the 2019 Skate Canada International, You successfully landed a ratified triple Axel in the short program to place second behind new training mate Rika Kihira of Japan with a new personal best score (78.22). She noted that this was a moment she had been working toward for three years. In the free skate, she fell on another triple Axel attempt and placed fourth in the segment. Overall, her total score of 217.49 was enough for the bronze medal, after Alexandra Trusova and Kihira. You's success at Skate Canada led to her being given a second Grand Prix assignment, the 2019 Cup of China, where she placed fourth after mistakes in both programs.

You entered the 2020 South Korean Championships as the defending champion and, given her success on the international circuit, was favored to repeat her title. After placing first in both segments, she won the gold medal ahead of Lee Hae-in and Kim Ye-lim. She was assigned to the Korean teams for the 2020 World Championships along with Kim, and the 2020 Four Continents Championships with Kim and Lim Eun-soo.

Two weeks later, at the 2020 Youth Olympics in Lausanne, she placed first in the short program, a little less than 2 points ahead of Ksenia Sinitsyna of Russia. Because of the different competition requirements at the junior level, she did not attempt a triple Axel in the short program. She then won the free skate by over 12 points and won the title overall, landing eight clean triples in the free skate for the first time, including a triple Axel and two triple Lutz combinations. By doing so, she ended Russia's winning streak in girls' singles at the Winter Youth Olympics, which included previous champions Elizaveta Tuktamysheva (2012) and Polina Tsurskaya (2016).

In February, You returned to the senior level for the 2020 Four Continents Championships. She placed third in the short program behind Rika Kihira and Bradie Tennell after a mistake on her triple Axel and an unclear edge call on her triple flip. In the free skate, she delivered a strong performance to place second in the segment with a new personal best score (149.68). She landed all jumps cleanly, with the exception of one under rotation on her triple flip. Her combined total (223.23) was also a personal best, and she moved up to narrowly take the silver medal behind Kihira (232.34) and ahead of Tennell (222.97). This competition was the first time she landed all twelve triple jumps possible under the Zayak rule. She expressed satisfaction with her performance overall, for landing the triple Axel, and for overcoming the pressure of performing for a home crowd, remarking that she became the first Korean skater to medal at Four Continents since Olympic Champion Yuna Kim won the event in 2009.  She was assigned to make her senior World Championship debut in Montreal, but these were cancelled as a result of the coronavirus pandemic.

2020–2021 season 
With the pandemic continuing to affect international travel, the ISU opted to assign the Grand Prix based primarily on geographic location.  You was initially without a Grand Prix assignment but was subsequently added to the 2020 NHK Trophy roster once it was clear she could travel to Japan.  She was the lone non-Japanese entrant at the NHK Trophy and the only South Korean skater to compete on the Grand Prix that season.  Generally considered one of the frontrunners at the event, she had a poor showing in the short program, falling twice and underrotating three of her four triple jumps. As a result, she placed twelfth of twelve skaters in the segment. She called it "a really weird performance" and attributed it to a failure of nerves.  You placed fifth in the free skate, landing the triple Axel this time, and rose to seventh place overall.

In February, You competed at the 2021 South Korean Championships.  She placed narrowly first in the short program despite under-rotation calls but fell twice in the free skate, including on her triple Axel attempt, and dropped to fourth place overall. As a result, she was not named to Korea's team for the 2021 World Championships.

2021–2022 season: Beijing Olympics 
You began the season at the Skating Club of Boston's Cranberry Cup event, where she won the silver medal, 30 points behind champion Alysa Liu. She next went on the Challenger series to compete at the 2021 CS Autumn Classic International, where she was considered by many to be the gold medal favourite but ultimately took silver behind surprise winner Marilena Kitromilis of Cyprus. She did not land a clean triple Axel at either event.

Beginning the Grand Prix at the 2021 Skate America, You placed fifth in the short program after falling on her triple Axel attempt. She landed her opening triple Axel in the free skate, albeit deemed a quarter short on rotation, and placed second in that segment despite a few other minor jump issues. She finished with the bronze medal overall, 0.34 behind silver medalist Daria Usacheva. At her second event, the 2021 NHK Trophy, You failed to land her triple Axel in either segment, but still placed third in the short program and second in the free skate to take her second bronze medal of the Grand Prix season. She said afterwards that her goal for the season was "to just get to nationals with no injuries and take care of my body and, if I will do well, make it to the Olympics." 

You entered the 2022 South Korean Championships as the title favourite and placed first in both segments to win the gold medal. Her margin over the silver medalist Kim Ye-lim was 13.85 points. She and Kim were named to the South Korean Olympic team, and sent to compete at the 2022 Four Continents Championships alongside bronze medalist Lee Hae-in. You struggled at the event in Tallinn, botching the triple Axel attempt in both segments and finishing sixth overall, behind both Lee and Kim.

Competing at the 2022 Winter Olympics in Beijing, You started the women's event sixth in the short program, having her triple Axel downgraded and receiving an edge call on her flip. In her view, "things were not perfectly done, but I think overall it's good." You placed fourth in the free skate despite underrotating her triple Axel but remained in sixth overall. She later revealed that her father had died while she was competing at these Olympics and, as a result, declined the invitation to skate in the Olympic Gala.

Shortly after the Olympics concluded, Vladimir Putin ordered an invasion of Ukraine, as a result of which the International Skating Union banned all Russian and Belarusian athletes from competing at the 2022 World Championships. This had a major impact on the women's field, which had been dominated by Russians for most of the preceding eight years, and You entered the championships as a serious podium contender. She opted not to attempt a triple Axel in the short program due to feeling uncertainty about it on the morning of, and performed a clean double Axel instead, albeit receiving quarter under rotation calls on two of her triple jumps. She finished fourth in the segment, 0.47 points behind third-place Mariah Bell of the United States. In the free skate, You underrotated some jumps, including her opening triple Axel, singled a planned triple loop, and fell on a triple flip attempt. She dropped to fifth overall.

2022–2023 season 
You began her season by winning a silver medal at the 2022 U.S. Classic behind teammate Kim Ye-lim. On the Grand Prix, she entered the 2022 Skate Canada International as one of the title favourites in the women's event, placing fourth in the short program after performing only a triple-double jump combination. She underrotated three jumps in the free skate, also placing fourth in that segment, but won the bronze medal. She said afterward, "I didn't expect a medal today because my competition was not as good as usual. When the coach told me I was third, I was really surprised, and I am thankful to the crowd that they cheer me up even though the performance was not the best." 

During her second Grand Prix event, 2022 MK John Wilson Trophy, You came down with a high fever and considered withdrawing from the competition. Deciding to compete but not fully recovered, You placed sixth in the short program after performing a triple-double combination rather than a scheduled triple-triple. She managed to skate a solid free program, however, placing third in that segment of the competition after completing six clean triple jumps and moving up to fourth-place overall. For her exhibition program at the event, she skated to "Like My Father" by Jax, which was dedicated to her father, who had died earlier that year.

Skating technique 
You landed her first successful triple Axel jump in competition at the 2019 CS Lombardia Trophy in Italy during the ISU Challenger Series, becoming the first Korean woman to do so. 

You usually opens with the triple Axel (3A) in both the Short Program and Free Skate. She prefers to enter a triple loop (3Lo) with a spread eagle. You also competes with the triple Lutz-triple toe loop (3Lz+3T),  the triple Lutz-Euler-triple Salchow (3Lz+1Eu+3S) sequence, and the double Axel-triple toe loop (2A+3T) combination jumps.

After the 2022 Beijing Olympics, You mentioned her ambitions to land quadruple jumps. She is currently training the quadruple Salchow (4S) and the quadruple Lutz (4Lz). You has been video-ed landing a quadruple Salchow (4S), a quadruple loop (4Lo) and a quadruple Lutz (4Lz) but has never attempted a quadruple jump in competition.

The Choreographic Sequence (ChSq) of You's programs commonly features an ina bauer as well as a one-legged spiral.

Programs

Records and achievements 
At 11 years old, she is the youngest ever national champion of South Korea (2016)
Was the first torch bearer in the South Korean stretch of the 2018 Winter Olympics torch relay
Listed in Forbes’s 30 under 30 - Asia 2018
First Korean woman to successfully land a triple Axel in international competition
11th woman to successfully land a triple Axel in international competition
Was the flag bearer for South Korea at the 2020 Winter Youth Olympics Opening Ceremony
Set the highest Junior short program PCS score (33.26) at the 2020 Winter Youth Olympics
Set the highest Junior free skate PCS score (67.38) at the 2020 Winter Youth Olympics
First and currently only female skater to have landed the triple Axel at the Winter Youth Olympics
First Asian and non-Russian woman to win the gold medal in Figure skating at the Winter Youth Olympics
Won South Korea's first gold medal at the 2020 Winter Youth Olympics
First Korean skater to medal at Four Continents since Yuna Kim in 2009
First and currently only Korean woman to successfully land a triple Axel at the Winter Olympics
Highest placement for a Korean ladies single skater (6th) at the Winter Olympics besides Yuna Kim (1st in 2010 and 2nd in 2014)

Competitive highlights

GP: Grand Prix; CS: Challenger Series; JGP: Junior Grand Prix

Detailed results

Senior level 
Small medals for short and free programs awarded only at ISU Championships. Personal best highlighted in bold.

Junior level 

Personal best highlighted in bold.

Awards and recognition

References

External links 

 
 

2004 births
Living people
South Korean female single skaters
Figure skaters at the 2020 Winter Youth Olympics
Figure skaters at the 2022 Winter Olympics
Olympic figure skaters of South Korea
Youth Olympic gold medalists for South Korea
Four Continents Figure Skating Championships medalists
Figure skaters from Seoul